opened in Kōchi, Kōchi Prefecture, Japan in 2004. It is dedicated to the life and times of Sakamoto Ryōma and to the local area of Kami-machi and Kōchi more generally during the Bakumatsu period.

See also
 Sakamoto Ryōma Memorial Museum
 Kōchi Castle Museum of History
 Kōchi Prefectural Museum of History
 The Museum of Art, Kōchi
 Kōchi Literary Museum

References

External links

 Ryōma's Birthplace Memorial Museum
 Ryōma's Birthplace Memorial Museum

Kōchi
Museums in Kōchi Prefecture
Biographical museums in Japan
Museums established in 2004
2004 establishments in Japan